Chien Chih-cheng (d. 12 May 2016) was a Taiwanese veterinarian and animal welfare worker. Her suicide caused outrage across Taiwan over the inadequate legislation regarding animal euthanasia, as well as the issue of cyberbullying by netizens and the press.

Life
Chien graduated from the National Taiwan University as a veterinarian, achieving the highest score in Taiwan's 'Tekao' (特考) civil service examination. She worked as the head of a veterinarian clinic and appeared in a TV show which revealed that she had euthanized over 700 stray dogs
over two years. This led to many animal activists attacking her, and the Taiwanese media and netizens branded her as a female butcher (女屠夫) and female executioner (女劊子手).

On 5 May 2016, she injected herself with the same drug she used to euthanise the stray dogs, eventually passing on the 12th. She was 32. Her death shocked Taiwan into self-reflection, and prompted the government to hasten the passing of related legislation. It also led to widespread condemnation of the netizens and the media over the irresponsibly false portrayal of Chien.

References

Date of birth missing
2016 deaths
Taiwanese veterinarians
Animal welfare workers
Suicides by poison
Suicides in Taiwan
Women veterinarians
Victims of cyberbullying
2016 suicides